The surname Figner may refer to:
Aleksandr Figner (1787—1813), Russian colonel
Vera Figner (1852–1942), Russian revolutionary
Nikolay and Medea Figner, Russian opera duo
Nikolay Figner (1857–1918), lyric tenor
Medea Figner (1859–1952), mezzo-soprano, later soprano
Federico Figner, German-born Argentine cinematographer
Fred Figner,  Czech-born Jewish emigrant, pioneer in recording and selling Brazilian popular music